Sandra Van Embricqs (born April 14, 1968) is a Surinamese former professional basketball player. She played in the Women's National Basketball Association (WNBA) for the Los Angeles Sparks in 1998.

Following her professional career, Van Embricqs was named girls coach at Chino High School in Chino, California in 2010.

References

External links
Profile at archive.fiba.com
WNBA stats @ sports-reference.com

1968 births
Living people
Centers (basketball)
Sportspeople from Paramaribo
Surinamese women's basketball players
Dutch women's basketball players
Surinamese emigrants to the Netherlands
Dutch expatriate basketball people in the United States
High school basketball coaches in California
Los Angeles Sparks players
Power forwards (basketball)
UCLA Bruins women's basketball players
Undrafted Women's National Basketball Association players